Emile Bruno Aime Marchildon (November 22, 1888 – February 26, 1967) was a Canadian professional ice hockey player. He played with the Montreal Canadiens and the Toronto Ontarios of the National Hockey Association.

References

1888 births
1967 deaths
Canadian ice hockey left wingers
Ice hockey people from Ontario
Montreal Canadiens (NHA) players
Sportspeople from Simcoe County
Toronto Ontarios players